is a 1942 black-and-white Japanese war film directed by Kajiro Yamamoto, with special effects by Eiji Tsuburaya.

Plot 
In 1936, Imperial Japanese Navy pilot Tadaaki Tachibana (Akira Nakamura) visits his aunt's farm, where younger cousin Yoshikazu Tomoda (Kaoru Itō) expresses his wish to become a pilot.  Tadaaki encourages Yoshikazu only after challenging him to a cliff jump.

Yoshikazu undergoes basic training from 1937, participating in rowing, kendō, wrestling, and rugby.  His drill instructor introduces the notion of facing adversity with the proper "spirit".  One morning, the Marco Polo Bridge Incident is reported in the cadets' newspaper.  The cadets intensify their training as the events of the Second Sino-Japanese War and the Second World War in Europe unfold.  Their drill instructor declares that the situation in China may only be resolved through the defeat of the United States and the British Empire.

After a brief visit to his family, Yoshikazu progresses to training as a fighter pilot.  He experiences survivor guilt when another cadet dies during a training exercise aboard an aircraft carrier.  Tadaaki advises him not to give up his training, citing his own experiences in the military.  Yoshikazu's sister Kikuko (Setsuko Hara) is concerned about the explosion of a world war, but informs him that their mother has accepted his decision to fight.

In late 1941, Yoshikazu is among those aboard an aircraft carrier destined for Pearl Harbor, although their mission is not immediately clear.  As the pilots prepare for the attack, the officers listen for results over an American radio station.  The mission is portrayed as a success: the torpedoes hit their intended target ships, and reinforcements engage in a dogfight with USAAF fighter planes.  However, in a "precious sacrifice", one damaged Japanese plane crashes into an American hangar.

Meanwhile in Japanese-occupied French Indochina, a separate unit receives a briefing concerning the movements of HMS Repulse and HMS Prince of Wales.  An initial attempt to bomb the ships during their nighttime departure from Singapore is aborted.  Despite the ships leaving the range of the bombers, their crews are instructed to re-attempt the mission.  The crew of one bomber, acknowledging that they lack the fuel to return home, proceeds with the attack on the British fleet.  This mission too is successful, although the Prince of Wales incidentally sinks after the bomber runs out of ammunition.  

Yoshikazu's family listens to a report of the attack on the radio, as do the officers aboard the aircraft carrier.  One officer expresses his pleasure at Japan's strategic position.

Production

It used special effects and miniature models to create realistic battle scenes. These were intercut with genuine newsreel material to make the appearance of a documentary. The film was released during the week of the first anniversary of the Japanese attack on Pearl Harbor.

The special effects are by Eiji Tsuburaya.

Reception

Box office
Within its first eight days at the Japanese box office, the film had grossed . According to Toho, it was viewed by 100 million people in Japan and the country's occupied territories.

Critical response
Joseph L. Anderson comments that Hawai Mare oki kaisen was "representative of the national-policy films", with the aim of dramatizing "the Navy Spirit as culminated at Pearl Harbor." Critics at the time considered it the best film of 1942.

Douglas MacArthur's response
The War at Sea from Hawaii to Malaya was confiscated by Supreme Command Allied Powers after the war, who mistook it for genuine news footage of the attack, and it was released by Movietone as such.

Accolades

Cast 

 Susumu Fujita
 Setsuko Hara
 Fumito Matsuo
 Kunio Mita
 Denjirō Ōkōchi
 Jiro Takano
 Daihachiro Takebayashi
 Haruo Tanaka
 Frank Tokunaga as Bunroku Tokunaga
 Hiroshi Yamagawa

See also 
 Storm Over the Pacific, Toho, 1960

Notes

References

External links 
 
 

Japanese World War II propaganda films
Japanese black-and-white films
1942 films
Films directed by Kajiro Yamamoto
1942 war films
Best Film Kinema Junpo Award winners
Toho films